Egg Venture is a 1997 arcade first-person shooter game developed by The Game Room and published by Innovative Concepts in Entertainment (ICE).

Egg Venture is set up unusually for a game. The simple arcade game plot was to "shoot bad things" and avoid "shooting good things". In the first version of Egg Venture, players progressed through the game based on "days" instead of levels. Each "day" players chose four unique missions of play that involved these CGI eggs with faces and floating hands.

Missions provided including target practice shooting frying pans instead of eggs, protecting scuba egg divers from green piranhas and mines, or shooting an egg's submarine through the sea.

The original version of Egg Venture had no ending, and was programmed to simply get harder and harder until either the player was overwhelmed by the difficulty or simply gave up because of boredom.  The game had several glitches, due to the nature of the hardware.

Later in 1997, The Game Room released a deluxe version called Egg Venture Deluxe, which plotted an egg traveling around the world, bumping into landmarks along the way.  Most of the game's missions remained the same as the original version, however, many of the bugs were fixed and there was actually an ending that could've been achieved in the game.

The theme music in the game bears a resemblance to "The Great Egg Race" by Martin Cooke and Richard Denton, but this appears to have been legitimately licensed.

Players can lose lives by:
Shooting an egg.
Letting an egg die where the players protect them.
Failing to reach a quota.

The Game Room also released a ticket redemption game called Eggs Playing Chicken, which used the same egg characters from this game. The eggs drove towards a brick wall, and the player had to stop them as close as possible to the brick wall without them crashing into it.

External links 
 Egg Venture at Arcade History

1997 video games
Arcade video games
Arcade-only video games
Video games developed in the United States